The Cooper Mark IV was a Formula Three, Formula Two and Formula One racing car designed and built by the Cooper Car Company at Surbiton, Surrey, England, in 1950.

Following the adoption of the 500cc formula for F3 in 1949, Cooper evolved the Mark III to use a  JA Prestwich Industries (JAP) single.

The ladder frame was retained, with the aluminum body supported by hoops. Lockheed twin-shoe disc brakes became standard, coupled to two master cylinders. The suspension was Fiat 500 transverse leaf spring independent suspension, used at front and rear.

History
The Mark IV came in a standard version (T11) for F3, and long-wheelbase (T12) variant for F2. Standard for the T11 was a  one-cylinder Speedway JAP engine. The T12 was powered by a 1000cc engine. The first 500 modified with a 1000cc JAP twin was prepared by customer Spike Rhiando in 1948. In 1949, a model powered by the  engine from an MG TD was built, and won on its first outing. Cliff Davis was the most successful driver to campaign one.

Cars were supplied without engines, which the customer provided. (This would become routine in Formula One in later years.) The T12s were best-suited for hillclimbs and sprints, not being durable enough for longer events.

The F2 Mark IV, based on the TD-engined variant, appeared in 1952. It was powered by a   Bristol inline six, giving up  to the Ferraris. At just , they had  on the Ferraris, and better cornering, due to their mid-mounted engines. It made its debut in at Goodwood on Easter Monday, run by Eric Brandon and Alan Brown (for Ecurie Richmond) and Mike Hawthorn (driving for Bob Chase). Hawthorn took the Formula Two event and one of the two Formula Libre races, and came second behind González' 4½ l Ferrari in another Libre outing. It marked the first mid-engined entrant in Formula Two, and only the second marque in top-rank European racing, following Auto Union.

Mark IVs competed successfully in F2 throughout 1952 and 1953, driven by Hawthorn, Peter Collins, and of course John Cooper himself, among others. (Stirling Moss' unsuccessful Cooper-Alta was actually built by a different John Cooper, Autocars sport editor.) In September 1950, Raymond Sommer died in a wreck at Cadours in a T12. It sold used at £425 in 1952.

Arthur Owen modified a Mark IV with a streamlined glassfibre body and 250cc Norton engine late in 1957. Bill Knight used this car to set five speed records at Monza.

Cooper T12

The Cooper T12 was a Formula Two/Formula Three racing car produced by the Cooper Car Company.

The car was developed as the long chassis version of the Cooper Mk IV design, making it eligible to use in both F3 (with JAP 0.5 L engines) and F2 (with JAP 1.0/1.1 L engines).

In  it made a single outing in a Formula One World Championship race, entered by Horschell Racing Corporation for Harry Schell at the Monaco Grand Prix, where he retired. It was also used by various privateers. Altogether it was used at 35 races, achieving two podium positions. Its only win was achieved by John Barber at the 500 Car Club Formula 2 Race.

Complete Formula One World Championship results
(key) (results in bold indicate pole position, results in italics indicate fastest lap)

Notes

Sources 
Kettlewell, Mike. "Cooper: Forerunner of the Modern Racing Car", in Northey, Tom, editor. World of Automobiles, Volume 4, pp. 427–433. London: Phoebus, 1974.
 racing-database.com statistics

External links 
Racing Database
http://www.loosefillings.com

1950 Formula One season cars
Cooper Formula One cars
Cooper racing cars
Formula Two cars
Formula Three cars